Amy's Orgasm (title censored to Amy's O in many video shops) is a 2001 film directed by Julie Davis. It stars Julie Davis as Amy, a 29-year-old Jewish woman who usually avoids dating as she does not believe in love. The film won the "Audience Choice Award" in the 2001 Santa Barbara International Film Festival.

Premise 

Amy is a single 29-year-old Jewish woman. She wrote a successful self-help book about how women can't truly be in love and experience "mental orgasm". Her parents and acquaintances always try to give her advice. Eventually, she breaks her celibacy and starts dating radio shock jock Matthew Starr, who is known for hitting on his bimbo guests. Of all men, will she find in him the true love she never believed in, or will he prove her worst fears true?

Cast

 Julie Davis as Amy Mandell
 Nick Chinlund as Matthew Starr
 Caroline Aaron as Janet Gaines
 Mitchell Whitfield as Don
 Jennifer Bransford as Elizabeth
 Jeff Cesario as Priest
 Mary Ellen Trainor as Amy's Mom
 Charles Cioffi as Amy's Dad
 Tina Lifford as Irene Barris
 Michael Harris as Jerry Hegeman
 Vincent Castellanos as Hans
 Julie Bowen as Nikki
 Andrea Bendewald as Beautiful Girl

References

External links 

 
 
 

2001 films
American romantic comedy films
2001 romantic comedy films
American sex comedy films
2000s English-language films
Films critical of the Catholic Church
American independent films
2000s sex comedy films
2001 independent films
2000s American films
English-language romantic comedy films